Overslag may refer to:

Places 
 Overslag, Belgium, a village in Belgium
 Overslag, Netherlands, a village in Netherlands